Jugal Kishore Sharma (born 5 December 1962) is an Indian politician. He was a member of Lower House of Parliament (Lok Sabha) following the 2014 Indian general election in Jammu and Kashmir, being elected from Jammu constituency as a candidate of Bharatiya Janata Party. He has been re-elected as a member of Lower House of Parliament in the 2019 Indian general election in Jammu and Kashmir from Jammu constituency. He is a Rashtriya Swamyamsewak Sangh worker.

References

People from Jammu (city)
Living people
Jammu and Kashmir MLAs 2002–2008
India MPs 2014–2019
Lok Sabha members from Jammu and Kashmir
Bharatiya Janata Party politicians from Jammu and Kashmir
1962 births
India MPs 2019–present
Jammu and Kashmir MLAs 2008–2014